Segni  is an Italian surname. Notable people with the name include:

 Antonio Segni (1891–1972), Italian politician, prime minister and fourth president of the Italian Republic
 Giulio Segni(1498-1561), Italian composer 
 Mario Segni (born 1939), Italian politician and son of Antonio Segni

See also 

 Segni (disambiguation)